Nissen-Lie classification is a system of categorizing Colles' fractures. In the Nissen-Lie classification system there are seven types of fractures. The classification system was first published in 1939.

Classification
 Type 1: A fracture at the junction of the shaft and distal extremity of the radius (occurs only in children between the age of 1 and 15 years, and is most commonly a greenstick fracture)
 Type 2: Slipping of the epiphysis with dorsal displacement, often with a dorsally avulsed triangular fragment of the radius (occurs in the age range 10-20 years)
 Type 3: Minimal displacement
 Type 4: Dorsal angulation, extra-articular, no comminution
 Type 5: Intra-articular, comminuted
 Type 6: Fractures of the radial styloid
 Type 7: Fractures with dorsal displacement

See also
 Frykman classification
 Gartland & Werley classification
 Lidström classification
 Older's classification

Orthopedic classifications